Boy & Girl (Traditional Chinese: 男才女貌, Pinyin: Nan Cai Nu Mao), also known as Love in the City, is a successful youth drama in China. When broadcast in 2003 on China Central Television (CCTV) in 2003, it dominated over all other series with an average of 80 million audience each night. The story introduces you into the lives of the young generation from real-life obstacles to seeking a lover in the modern society. This drama stars Ruby Lin and Lu Yi. This drama ranked 2nd place of highest view rating of China in 2003

Plot summary

Talented Guy and Pretty Girl of the youth image drama - A modern Cinderella love story
Su La & Yan Ru Yu (Su La's best friend) have graduated from college, Shanghai graduate university. The two are hopelessly in love with their careers. With the face of double stress, two good friends encourage each other and swear to go explore the world out of Shanghai. As they promise, the two came to work at the same travel agency. By chance, Su La gets to meet the young successful CEO Qiu Shi. Qiu Shi is deeply attracted to Su La and starts to pursue her love. One pursue after another. However, because of her strong self-esteem and the fact that she is still recovering from the last relationship, Su La is unwilling to accept Qiu Shi. She is determined to concentrate on helping her boss, Liu Hao Dong, to advance the first step into Shanghai tourism enterprise.

In the tense society and the work competition, Su La & Yan Ru Yu is struggling to make their ways, so the two choose two different paths. Yan Ru Yu violates the work ethics, betrays the travel agency and puts the blame on Su La, who then loses her job. Because of this, their friendship is broken and they separate from each other.

However, this does not discourage Su La. Not only does she recover from the setback but she unites with her former-colleague from the travel agency. With the two of them together, they manage and own a bar for women. However, she has to go through several difficulties to get where she is. Qiu Shi, having such strong feelings for Su La. He then has forgotten about his CEO superior and is there for Su La repeatedly. The two go through bumpy roads as a couple and eventually become like family members at last. As for Yan Ru Yu, she marries her boss, Liu Hao Dong, but the result was not what she expected. After reconsidering, she chooses the correct path, & makes a fresh start in Shanghai.

This series has tried hard to unfold modern metropolis’ life with different life experience, different personality, and different experience of the youth exactly how young people's life.

Cast
Names used in the Philippines are in parentheses
Ruby Lin (林心如) as Su La/ Eula
Lu Yi (陆毅) as Qiu Shi/ Eugene
Zeng Li (曾黎) as Yan Ru Yu
Yu Xiao Wei (于小伟) as Liu Hao Dong
Wu Jia Ni (吴佳尼) as Chen Xiao Fang
Jiang Hua as Jing Sa
Feng Shaofeng as Yin Shan
Yu Yi (于毅) as Zhao Lei
Zhao Chang (赵畅) as Chen Ya Ji
Zhou Hao Shi (周浩) as Lu Ke
Zhou Lei (周蕾) as Bao Ai Hua
Qiu Tian (邱添) - Dou Dou
Wang Zheng Quan (王政权) as Yan Ru Hai
Wang Lu (王璐) as A Mi
Jiang Bing Bing (蒋冰冰) as Chen Yong Hua
Wang Wei Hua (王伟华) as Hou Jun
Ma Li (马莉) as Ting Ting

Titles
 English Title (Asia Version): Boy & Girl
 English Title (US Version): Love in the City
 English Title (Philippine Version): Serendipity
 English Title (Internet Fan Version): Talented Guy & Pretty Girl (TGPG)
 Vietnamese Title: Trai Tài Gái Sắc
 Korean Title: 보이&걸

Production
 Production: Mainland China; filming all took place in Shanghai
 Product Person: Yang Bu Ting (杨步亭), Hou Yu Qin (侯豫秦)
 Total Supervised Manufacture: Han San Ping (韩三平), Hou Yu Qin (侯豫秦)
 Supervised Manufacture: Song Zhen Shan (宋振山), Jin Zhong Jiang (Qiang) (金忠强)
 Producer: Bai Ge (白鸽), He Pan Pan (何盼盼), Stanley Tong (Tang Ji Li)
 Director: Zhang Jia Jun (蔣家駿)
 Screenwriter: Zhou Chong (Yong) (周涌)
 Year of Production: Fall of 2002
 Year Release: 2003

International broadcasts

Gallery and trailer

Gallery
Ruby Lin International Family

Trailer
Sina Episode 1 - 5 Trailer
Sina Episode 6 - 20 Trailer

External links
  Ruby Station
  Official site at SINA.com
  Starlight International Media Boy & Girl Official Site
  Official China network site at CCTV
  Official Hong Kong network site at ATV
  Official Taiwan network site at ETTV

Television shows set in Shanghai
2003 Chinese television series debuts
Chinese romance television series
Works about adolescence
Mandarin-language television shows